Hilbert is both a Germanic masculine given name and surname. Notable people with the name include:

Given name:
Hilbert Bair (1894–1985), American World War I flying ace
Hilbert Schenck (born 1926), science fiction writer and engineer
Hilbert Shirey, American poker player
Hilbert van der Duim (born 1957), Dutch speed skater
Hilbert Van Dijk (1918–2001), Australian fencer
Hilbert Philip Zarky (1912–1989), American tax attorney

Surname:
Andy Hilbert (born 1981), U.S. hockey player
Anton Hilbert (1898-1986), German politician
Carl Aage Hilbert (1899–1953), Danish Prefect of the Faroe Islands
David Hilbert (1862–1943), German mathematician
Donna Hilbert (born 1946), American poet who also writes short stories, plays, and essays
Egon Hilbert (1899–1968), Austrian opera/theatre director
Ernest Hilbert (born 1970), American poet, critic, and editor
Ernest Lenard Hilbert (1920–1942), American Air Force hero
Garrett Hilbert (born 1987), member of American trick shot conglomerate Dude Perfect
Georges Hilbert (1900-1982), French sculptor.
Jaroslav Hilbert (1871–1936), Czech dramatist and writer
Lukas Loules (born Hilbert, 1972), German musician and music producer
Morton Hilbert (1917–1998), professor of public health and environmentalist
Roberto Hilbert (born 1984), German footballer
Rodrigo Hilbert (born 1980), Brazilian actor and model
Stephen Hilbert, American mathematician
Vi Hilbert (1918–2008), Native American tribal elder

German-language surnames
Dutch masculine given names
Danish masculine given names
Surnames from given names